Attingal Lok Sabha constituency is one of the 20 Lok Sabha constituencies in Kerala state in southern India. This constituency came into existence in 2008 following the delimitation of the parliamentary constituencies based on the recommendation of the Delimitation Commission of India constituted in 2002.

Assembly segments

Attingal Lok Sabha constituency is composed of the following assembly segments:

Members of Parliament

As Chirayinkil

As Attingal

Election results

General election 2019

General election 2014

See also
 Chirayinkil (Lok Sabha constituency)
 List of Constituencies of the Lok Sabha
 Indian general election, 2014 (Kerala)
 2014 Indian general election

References

External links
 Election Commission of India: https://web.archive.org/web/20081218010942/http://www.eci.gov.in/StatisticalReports/ElectionStatistics.asp

Lok Sabha constituencies in Kerala
Politics of Thiruvananthapuram district